The Fifth Element is a 1997 English-language French science fiction action film conceived and directed by Luc Besson, as well as co-written by Besson and Robert Mark Kamen. It stars Bruce Willis, Gary Oldman, Ian Holm, Milla Jovovich, and Chris Tucker. Primarily set in the 23rd century, the film's central plot involves the survival of planet Earth, which becomes the responsibility of Korben Dallas (Willis), a taxicab driver and former special forces major, after a young woman (Jovovich) falls into his cab. To accomplish this, Dallas joins forces with her to recover four mystical stones essential for the defence of Earth against the impending attack of a malevolent cosmic entity.

Besson started writing the story that was developed as The Fifth Element when he was 16 years old; he was 38 when the film opened in cinemas. Besson wanted to shoot the film in France, but suitable facilities could not be found; filming took place in London and Mauritania instead. He hired comic artists Jean "Moebius" Giraud and Jean-Claude Mézières, whose books inspired parts of the film, for production design. Costume design was by Jean-Paul Gaultier.

The Fifth Element received mainly positive reviews, although some critics were highly negative. The film won in categories at the British Academy Film Awards, the César Awards, the Cannes Film Festival, and the Lumières Awards, but also received nominations at the Golden Raspberry and Stinkers Bad Movie Awards. The Fifth Element was a strong financial success, earning more than US$263million at the box office on a $90million budget. At the time of its release, it was the most expensive European film ever made, and it remained the highest-grossing French film at the international box office until the release of The Intouchables in 2011.

Plot
In 1914, aliens known as Mondoshawans meet their human contact, a priest of a secret order, at an ancient Egyptian temple. They take the only weapon capable of defeating a great evil that appears every five thousand years, promising to protect it and return it before the great evil's re-emergence. The weapon consists of the four classical elements, as four engraved stones, plus a sarcophagus containing a "fifth element".

In 2263, the great evil appears in deep space as a giant living fireball. It destroys an armed Earth spaceship as it heads to Earth. The Mondoshawans' current human contact on Earth, priest Vito Cornelius, informs the President of the Federated Territories of the great evil's history and of the weapon that can stop it.

On their way to Earth, a Mondoshawan spacecraft carrying the weapon is ambushed and destroyed by a crew of Mangalores, alien mercenaries hired by Earth industrialist Jean-Baptiste Emanuel Zorg, who is working for the great evil. A severed hand in metal armor from the wreckage of the spacecraft is brought to New York City. From this, the government uses biotechnology to recreate the original occupant of the sarcophagus, a humanoid woman named Leeloo who remembers her previous life. Alarmed by the unfamiliar surroundings and high security, she escapes and jumps off a ledge, crashing into the flying taxicab of Korben Dallas, a former major in Earth's Special Forces.

Dallas delivers Leeloo to Cornelius and his apprentice, David, who recognize her as the Fifth Element. As Leeloo recuperates, she tells Cornelius that the stones were not onboard the Mondoshawan ship. Simultaneously, the Mondoshawans inform Earth's government the stones were entrusted to an alien opera singer, the diva Plavalaguna. Zorg reneges on his deal with the Mangalores for failing to obtain the stones and kills some of them. Earth's military sends Dallas to meet Plavalaguna; a rigged radio contest provides a cover, awarding Dallas a luxury vacation aboard a flying hotel on planet Fhloston, accompanied by flamboyant talk-show host Ruby Rhod. It includes a concert by Plavalaguna, and learning that Leeloo shares his mission, Dallas lets her accompany him. Cornelius instructs David to prepare the temple, then stows away on the luxury spaceship. The Mangalore crew, pursuing the stones for themselves, also illegally board the ship.

During the concert, the Mangalores attack and Plavalaguna dies. Dallas extracts the stones from her body and kills the Mangalore leader, causing the others to surrender. Zorg arrives, shoots and traumatizes Leeloo, and activates a time bomb. He flees with a carrying case he presumes contains the stones, but returns when he discovers it is empty. He deactivates his bomb, but a dying Mangalore sets off his own, destroying the hotel and killing Zorg. Meanwhile, Dallas, Cornelius, Leeloo, and Rhod escape with the stones in Zorg's private spaceship.

As the great evil approaches Earth, the four meet David at the temple. They deploy the stones, but Leeloo, having learned of humanity's own terrible history of war, has given up on life. Dallas declares his love for her and kisses her. In response, Leeloo combines the power of the stones, emitting divine light onto the great evil and defeating it. She and Dallas are hailed as heroes and, as dignitaries wait to greet them, the two passionately embrace in a recovery chamber.

Cast

Themes
In an interview, Besson stated The Fifth Element was not a "big theme movie", although the film's theme was an important one. He wanted viewers to reach the point where Leeloo states, "What's the use of saving life when you see what you do with it?" and agree with her. Jay P. Telotte, writing in the book Science Fiction Film, credited the film with exploring the theme of political corruption.

Brian Ott and Eric Aoki writing in the feminist journal Women's Studies in Communication considered gender to be one of the film's central themes. The authors criticized the film for erasing women from the introductory scenes, noting that only two appeared in the first twenty minutes: an androgynous, mostly speechless presidential aide, and Leeloo undergoing reconstruction. When females appear in the film, they are presented as passive objects, such as the sexualised flight and McDonald's attendants; or stripped of their femininity, such as the "butch" Major Iceborg.

Stefan Brandt, in the book Subverting Masculinity, also said that the film "echoes stereotypical beliefs about gender" of all females in the film. He said that Leeloo left her passive role only during her fight with the Mangalores. Except for Tiny Lister's portrayal of the President, Brandt said that all males in the film were shown as unmanly as possible in various ways, such as Ruby Rhod's effeminacy, Vito Cornelius's clumsy form of speech, and General Munro's stupidity; their purpose was to make Korben's masculinity appear "god-like" by comparison.

In the book The Films of Luc Besson, Susan Hayward considered The Fifth Element to be a classic story of a man "making his break from the tribe, proving his manhood, overthrowing the malevolent forces, and killing the chief, finally to reap the rewards of security and marriage". Korben's journey, however, is threatened not only by the Mangalores and Zorg, but also by Leeloo, who does not relent or help him until the last minute, when she accepts his declaration of love. The love story within The Fifth Element was considered to be one of the main narratives in the film, and it faces the same deadline as the main storyline. Hayward also considered the film to grapple with environmental damage, in so far as waste and pollution are visible throughout the film. Whereas science-fiction films often show a world wherein some new technology or threat either surpasses or fails humanity, The Films of Luc Besson included The Fifth Element among the minority of science-fiction films that "hold up a mirror" and show humankind as responsible. Hayward said the film was skeptical of capitalist consumerism, in so far as the gadgets Zorg collected in his office suggested that he had an unhealthy obsession for technology. The tension between technology and man is treated as a problem requiring a final resolution.

Production
As a teenager, Besson envisioned the world of The Fifth Element in an attempt to alleviate boredom. He began writing the script when he was 16, though the film was not released in cinemas until he was 38. The original story was set in the year 2300 and was about a "nobody" named Zaltman Bleros (later renamed Korben Dallas) who wins a trip to the Club Med resort on the planet Fhloston Paradise in the Angel constellation. There, he meets Leeloo, a "sand-girl" who has the "beauty of youth" despite being over 2,000 years old.

Besson continued to work on the story for years. By 1991, when his documentary film Atlantis was released, he had a 400-page script. Nicolas Seydoux and Patrice Ledoux from Gaumont were the first people to take on the project. In November 1991, while looking for actors for the film, Besson met French comics creators Jean Giraud and Jean-Claude Mézières and recruited them for the film's production design. Giraud and Mézières's comics inspired the look that Besson wanted for his futuristic New York City.

Mézières had designed The Circles of Power (1994), which contains a character named S'Traks, who drives a flying taxicab through the congested air of the vast metropolis on the planet Rubanis. Mézières showed images of the flying taxi to Besson, who was inspired to change character Korben Dallas's background from a worker in a rocket-ship factory to a taxi driver who flies his cab around a Rubanis-inspired futuristic New York City. Besson's production also hired five other artists for the project. In addition, the noted fashion designer Jean-Paul Gaultier was hired to create the costumes. The team spent a year creating more than 8,000 drawings.

During this time, Besson approached both Bruce Willis and Mel Gibson for the lead role. Willis expressed interest, though he was reluctant to take on the role as the film was considered risky after his previous two films, Hudson Hawk and Billy Bathgate, had been received poorly. Gibson eventually turned down the role. While the production team impressed film companies with their designs, they struggled to find one willing to take on a budget approaching nearly $100million. In December 1992, production stopped without any prior warning, and the team disbanded.

Besson wrote and directed the commercially successful film Léon: The Professional (1994). During that period, he continued to work on the script for The Fifth Element, shortening it. He reduced the film's budget to $90million before again attempting to find a studio willing to produce it. Columbia Pictures, which had a partnership in Leon, agreed to finance the film. By this time, Besson had decided to go with a lesser-known lead actor to save on production costs. Besson happened to be in Barry Josephson's office when Willis called regarding a different film. Besson asked to speak to Willis "just to say hello", and told him that The Fifth Element was finally going ahead, explaining his decision to go with a less-expensive actor. After a short silence, Willis said, "If I like the film, we can always come to an arrangement." After reading the script, Willis agreed to take on the role.

Production began in early August 1995. Besson traveled to various places for casting, including Paris, London and Rome. He hired Gary Oldman (who had starred in Léon) for the role of Zorg, describing Oldman as "one of the top five actors in the world".

For the character Leeloo, Besson chose Milla Jovovich from the 200 to 300 applicants he met in person. The "Divine Language" spoken by Leeloo is a fictional language of 400 words, invented by Besson. To practice, Jovovich and Besson held conversations and wrote letters to each other in the language. Besson was then married to Maïwenn Le Besco, who played the role of Diva Plavalaguna when filming began. He left her to take up with Jovovich during filming. Jovovich and Besson later married but divorced two years later in 1999.

Although he wanted to shoot the film in France, Besson could not find suitable facilities and filmed in London. It was primarily filmed at Pinewood Studios on seven soundstages including the 007 Stage. Construction of sets began in October 1995. The opera scene was filmed at the Royal Opera House. Scenes depicted as being in Egypt were filmed in Mauritania; the first shoot, a background shot of the desert, occurred there on 5 January 1996. Filming with actors began in late January, and was completed 21 weeks later. Willis finished filming on 16 May, while Oldman only commenced filming the following week; the protagonist (Korben) and antagonist (Zorg) never actually share any screen time. Despite being filmed in London, The Fifth Element was a French production, the costliest European film ever made at the time.

The designs of buildings in New York were derived from both metabolist-inspired masses of modular apartments from the 1960s and the futuristic designs of architect Antonio Sant'Elia in the 1910s. Besson demanded that most of the action shots take place in broad daylight, as he was reportedly tired of the dark spaceship corridors and dimly lit planets common in science-fiction films, and wanted a brighter, "cheerfully crazy" look as opposed to a gloomy, realistic one.

Gaultier designed each of the 900 costumes worn by extras in the Fhloston Paradise scenes and checked each costume every morning. His designs, described as "intellectually transgressive", were said to challenge sexuality and gender norms. A single jacket he designed for the film cost $5,000. Jovovich's costume worn from when her character was first revived was inspired by typical hospital dressing and bandages that provided minimal modesty.

The original name of the character Ruby Rhod was Loc Rhod, which appears both in the original script and in the novel adapted from the film. Hayward speculated that the name change was a play on data in the periodic table. Rubidium is the first of the period 5 elements, and exactly halfway along that row is the element rhodium. Using the first half of each element yields "Rubi Rhod". Others have speculated this name is a play on the character's gender-bending persona, with a feminine first name and phallic surname. Prince was cast to portray Rhod but could not schedule filming around his touring dates. Chris Tucker and Jamie Foxx were each considered for the role; Besson liked Foxx but felt that Tucker's smaller body suited the character better.

Effects

Three different teams handled the three different types of special effects used in the film. Nick Allder directed mechanical and pyrotechnical effects, Nick Dudman was placed in charge of 'creature' effects, and Mark Stetson headed the visual effects team. Visual effects company Digital Domain was hired, and Karen Goulekas was given the role of digital effects supervisor. Alias, Autodesk Softimage, Arete, Side Effect's Prisms, RenderMan, and in-house software, were used by Digital Domain to create effects. Some individual shots used a combination of live action, scale models, computer-generated imagery, and particle systems. The lanes of traffic in the scenes in New York City were created with particle systems:

Among the scale models used for filming were the buildings representing New York City. It took a team of eighty workers five months to build all the models. The windows of the buildings were cited by the team as one of the most time-consuming tasks, along with details behind the windows, such as furniture, blinds, lightboxes, and tiny pieces of flat artwork. Virtual sets built within digital environments were created to enhance the use of miniatures. Motion control cameras moved throughout the scale sets, and the data they collected was exported to track and generate the CG animation and particle systems. Other techniques used included digital matte paintings for backgrounds and the NURBS mathematical model for certain animations, including the sequence in which Leeloo's body is reconstructed.

Soundtrack
In The Fifth Element, some kind of music is playing during about ninety percent of the film; Besson's films have been described as "intrinsically musical".  The score was composed by Éric Serra. He relies chiefly on the use of orchestral textures, such as the oboe and strings heard as the surgeons prepare to regenerate Leeloo, and the pizzicato as she is reconstructed. Serra also used many non-French influences, such as the Stalinist fanfare heard before the spaceport sequence, the reggae piece played in preparation for the flight, and the hula music that greets the passengers as they arrive in Fhloston. More conventional scoring techniques are present in the leitmotif that first sounds when professor Pacoli mentions the fifth element, the militaristic snares as the warship prepares to attack the dark planet, and the Mahlerian funereal piece heard when Leeloo learns about war. The music used for the taxicab chase scene, titled "Alech Taadi" by Algerian performer Khaled, did not appear on the film soundtrack but is available on Khaled's album N'ssi N'ssi.

The Diva Dance opera performance used music from Gaetano Donizetti's Lucia di Lammermoor: "Il dolce suono", the mad scene of Act III, Scene 2. It is one of the few pieces of music in the film that is diegetic. It was sung by Albanian soprano Inva Mula. The role of Plavalaguna was played by French actress Maïwenn Le Besco. Part One (titled "Lucia di Lammermoor") and Part Two (titled "The Diva Dance") of this piece are included as separate tracks on The Fifth Element soundtrack but are sequenced to create the effect of the entire performance seen in the film. The end of Part One blends into the beginning of Part Two, creating a smooth transition between the two tracks.

Released as an album under Virgin Records, the soundtrack peaked at number 99 on the Billboard 200. More than 200,000 copies of the lengthy soundtrack were sold in France alone. Rodney Batdorf of AllMusic gave the album three out of five stars, stating it was "diverse and accomplished, and it is just as effective outside of the film as it is within it." A review from Filmtracks.com also awarded the album three out of five stars.

Release and reception

Initial screening
The film premiered on 7 May at the 1997 Cannes Film Festival, where it was selected as the opening film. Guests were given a "Fifth Element" Swatch, which was used as their ticket for entry. The event included a futuristic ballet, a fashion show by Jean-Paul Gaultier, and fireworks. Gaumont spent between $1million and $3million on the event, a record at the time. The film's North American release was handled by Sony Pictures Releasing via its Columbia Pictures label.

Box office
The film debuted at number one in the US, earning $17million on its opening weekend. It became a box-office success, grossing over $263million, almost three times its budget of $90million. About 75% of the receipts for The Fifth Element were from markets outside the United States, and it was the ninth-highest-grossing film of the year worldwide. It was the most successful film at the box office in France in 1997, with more than 7.69 million seeing the film. In Germany, the film was awarded the Goldene Leinwand, a sales certification award for selling more than three million tickets at the box office. The Fifth Element became the highest-grossing French film at the foreign box-office, a record it held for 16 years until the release of The Intouchables in 2011.

Critical response
Despite the popular response, critics were split in their response to The Fifth Element. Kevin Thomas of the Los Angeles Times described the film as an "elaborate, even campy sci-fi extravaganza, which is nearly as hard to follow as last year's Mission: Impossible". He concluded that The Fifth Element was "a lot warmer, more fun, and boasts some of the most sophisticated, witty production and costume design you could ever hope to see". On the American film review At the Movies, both Roger Ebert and Gene Siskel gave the film a "thumbs up". In his separate review for the Chicago Sun-Times, Ebert gave the film three stars out of four, calling it "One of the great goofy movies", and concluding, "I would not have missed seeing this film, and I recommend it for its richness of imagery. But at 127 minutes, which seems a reasonable length, it plays long."

The film also received reviews that criticized its overblown style. Todd McCarthy of Variety wrote, "A largely misfired European attempt to make an American-style sci-fi spectacular, The Fifth Element consists of a hodgepodge of elements that don't comfortably coalesce." David Edelstein of Slate said, "It may or may not be the worst movie ever made, but it is one of the most unhinged."

Chris Tucker's performance as Ruby Rhod also divided critics. He was praised in the Los Angeles Times and Time; the latter called him "the summer's most outrageous special effect". Josh Winning of Total Film, singled out Tucker's performance as the low point of the film, ranking it as number 20 on his 2011 list, "50 Performances That Ruined Movies".

The site's consensus reads: "Visually inventive and gleefully over the top, Luc Besson's The Fifth Element is a fantastic piece of pop sci-fi that never takes itself too seriously." At Metacritic, it has a weighted score of 52 outof 100 based on reviews from 22 critics, indicating "mixed or average" reviews. Audiences polled by CinemaScore gave the film an average grade of "B" on an A+ to F scale.

Plagiarism suit
Alejandro Jodorowsky and Jean Giraud sued Besson after the film was released, claiming The Fifth Element had plagiarised their comic The Incal. Giraud sued for 13.1million euros for unfair competition, 9million euros in damages and interest, and two to five percent of the net operating revenues of the film. Jodorowsky sued for 700,000 euros. The case was dismissed in 2004 on the grounds that only "tiny fragments" of the comic had been used and Giraud had been hired by Besson to work on the film before the allegations were made.

Adaptations
A novel was adapted from the screenplay of The Fifth Element, written by Terry Bisson; it was published by HarperPrism in 1997. Rumors arose after the film's release that it would be followed by a sequel, tentatively titled Mr. Shadow. In 2011 Besson said that he never planned a sequel and has no desire to make one.

Activision created a video game adaptation of The Fifth Element in 1998 for the PlayStation game console and PC. The PlayStation version generally received negative reviews, but the PC version was better received. Lauren Fielder from GameSpot described the PlayStation version as "quite possibly the worst game I've ever played". Doug Perry from IGN wrote: "Take Tomb Raider, add in Leeloo Multipass and boring puzzles, and you've got Fifth Element."

A racing game based on the film, New York Race, was released in 2001. Eurogamer gave the game 6 outof 10, concluding: "New York Race is a fun little arcade racer, which oozes style, but it's something you'll grow tired of extremely quickly and as such remains fun only in short bursts."

Accolades
The Fifth Element was nominated for Best Sound Editing at the 70th Academy Awards, and for Best Sound Editing at the 1998 Golden Reel Awards, but lost to Titanic in both cases. It won the BAFTA Award for Best Special Visual Effects, and the Lumières Award for Best Director. It was nominated for seven César awards, winning three: Best Director, Best Cinematography and Best Production Design. It was nominated for Film of the Year at the 1997 European Film Awards, as well as the Hugo Award for Best Dramatic Presentation, and the Satellite Award for Best Visual Effects. Thierry Arbogast was awarded the Technical Grand Prize at the 1997 Cannes Film Festival for his work on both The Fifth Element and She's So Lovely. The film received four Saturn Award nominations: Best Science Fiction Film, Best Costume, Best Special Effects, and Best Supporting Actress for Milla Jovovich. Jovovich's fight against the Mangalores was nominated for the MTV Movie Award for Best Fight, and the actress was also nominated for Best ActressNewcomer at the Blockbuster Entertainment Awards.

Conversely, Jovovich received a Golden Raspberry nomination for Worst Supporting Actress, and Chris Tucker was nominated for Worst New Star for his performances in both The Fifth Element and Money Talks. The film also received four nominations at the 1997 Stinkers Bad Movie Awards: Worst Picture, Worst Director, Worst Supporting Actor for Tucker and Worst Supporting Actress for Jovovich.

Home media
The original home video release of The Fifth Element took place in North America on 10 December 1997, on VHS, LaserDisc, and DVD. The original DVD presented the film in its original 2.39:1 anamorphic widescreen format, though carried no special features. The film was released in Sony's Superbit format in October 2001. In his review, Conrad Jeremy from IGN gave the picture quality of the original DVD release 9 outof 10, though awarded the Superbit version a perfect score for picture quality. Overall, the Superbit version was given 8 outof 10; the final score was brought down by the version's complete lack of special features.

An "Ultimate Edition" set of two DVDs was released on 11 January 2005. The only difference between the Superbit version and the Ultimate Edition disc one is the addition of a "fact track", which when turned on displays trivia about the film, cast, and crew as the film plays. The second disc provides various special features, focusing on visual production, special effects, fashion in the film, featurettes, and interviews with Willis, Jovovich, and Tucker, as well as featurettes on the four different alien races in the film and Diva Plavalaguna. Ian Jane of DVD Talk praised the Ultimate Edition for its special features.

The first Blu-ray release of the film on 20 June 2006 was criticised as having poor picture quality by Blu-ray standards, and for its lack of special features. In what has been called "an extremely rare move", Sony responded to complaints by making a remastered Blu-ray version available, released on 17 July 2007, and also offered a replacement exchange program for customers unhappy with the original Blu-ray release. Ben Williams from Blu-ray.com stated the remastered version "absolutely" made up for the substandard initial release, and praised its high video and audio quality; however, he criticised the continued lack of special features.

The 20th-anniversary 4K remaster was released on Ultra HD Blu-ray on 11 July 2017.

Legacy
The film has been described by CBS News, Rotten Tomatoes, and ComingSoon.com as a science-fiction cult classic. In 2007 the Visual Effects Society placed The Fifth Element at number 50, tied with Darby O'Gill and the Little People, on their list of the fifty most influential visual effects films of all time. In 2014 Time Out listed the film at number 42 on their "100 best sci-fi movies" list.

Film critic Mark Kermode reported that The Fifth Element was one of the most divisive films among his readers, regarded as both the best and the worst summer blockbuster of all time. Years later, Kermode recalled: "I remember very clearly being in Cannes when [The] Fifth Element was first played, and it really divided the audience." Stephen Cass of Discover ranked the film the third-best science-fiction film on subscription service Hulu, writing, "People seem to either like or loathe The Fifth Element ... Lavish visuals and entertaining performances from Bruce Willis, Milla Jovovich, and Gary Oldman make this movie worth watching." In some circles, the film has gained a "so-bad-it's-good" status; Meredith Woerner of io9 listed The Fifth Element as one of "The 20 Best Worst Science-Fiction Movies of All Time".

Cast comments
Willis spoke favourably of the film in a 1999 interview, concluding: "It was a real fun movie to make." Tucker and Jovovich also spoke favourably of both their experiences making the film and working with Besson in interviews on the Ultimate Edition DVD; Jovovich described Besson as "the first really amazing director I had worked with". Asked in a 2014 interview if he liked the film, Gary Oldman stated, "Oh no. I can't bear it." He had explained in 2011: "It was me singing for my supper because Luc had come in and partly financed [my film] Nil by Mouth."

Notes and references

Notes

References

Bibliography

External links
 
 
 
 

1990s science fiction action films
1997 action films
1997 films
1997 science fiction films
BAFTA winners (films)
English-language French films
Fictional-language films
Films about ancient astronauts
Films about extraterrestrial life
Films directed by Luc Besson
Films involved in plagiarism controversies
Films scored by Éric Serra
Films set in the 23rd century
Films set in 1914
Films set in Egypt
French films set in New York City
Films shot at Pinewood Studios
Films shot in London
Films shot in Mauritania
Films whose director won the Best Director César Award
Films whose director won the Best Director Lumières Award
Films with screenplays by Luc Besson
Films with screenplays by Robert Mark Kamen
Flying cars in fiction
French action adventure films
French science fiction action films
Gaumont Film Company films
Science fantasy films
Space adventure films
1990s English-language films
1990s French films
Foreign films set in the United States